Agnes of Austria (c. 1151/54 – 13 January 1182), a member of the House of Babenberg, was Queen of Hungary from 1168 until 1172 by her first marriage with King Stephen III of Hungary and Duchess of Carinthia by her second marriage with Duke Herman of Carinthia from 1173 until 1181.

Life
Agnes was the eldest child of the Babenberg duke Henry II of Austria and his second wife, the Byzantine princess Theodora Komnene.

Queen
In 1166, Duke Henry II, who was mediating a peace between King Stephen III of Hungary and Emperor Manuel I Komnenos, proposed a marriage between his daughter, Agnes and the young king. However, the King decided to marry Princess Yaroslavna of Halych (1167); nevertheless, this marriage ended soon: the princess was repudiated and sent back to her father in 1168. The negotiations with Austria were renewed and Agnes was married to King Stephen III in the same year.

Later life
Just after her husband's funeral, the widowed Agnes left for the Duchy of Austria with her father. One year later (1173) she was married again, to the Sponheim duke Herman of Carinthia. They had two sons: Ulrich II (born in 1176) and Bernhard II (born in 1180) who were later Dukes of Carinthia.

Duke Herman died in 1181. Agnes survived him only one year. She was buried in the Crypt of the Schottenstift in Vienna, next to her parents.

Sources
 Soltész, István: Árpád-házi királynék (Gabo, 1999)
 Kristó, Gyula - Makk, Ferenc: Az Árpád-ház uralkodói (IPC Könyvek, 1996)

References

1150s births
1182 deaths
12th-century Austrian women
Babenberg
House of Árpád
Remarried royal consorts
Hungarian queens consort
12th-century Austrian people
12th-century Hungarian people
12th-century Hungarian women
Daughters of monarchs